A Very Big Child is a 1952 West German comedy film directed by Paul Verhoeven and starring Georg Thomalla, Angelika Hauff and Gardy Granass.

It was shot at the Göttingen Studios as well as on location around Wiesbaden and West Berlin. The film's sets were designed by the art director Erich Grave.

Cast
 Georg Thomalla as Hans Hochberg
 Angelika Hauff as Ina Cornelius
 Gardy Granass as Liesel Kilian
 Karl Schönböck as Alexander van Straaten
 Erika von Thellmann as Tante Agathe
 Harald Paulsen as Hieronymus Benedikt
 Eugen Dumont as Bürgermeister
 Hans D. Bove as Professor Augustin
 Loni Heuser as Aline
 Kurt Vespermann as Vater Kilian
 Paul Verhoeven as Inspizient
 Doris Kiesow as Frau Becker
 Mila Kopp
 Horst Beck
 Waltraut Wieschendorff
 Axel Scholtz
 Theo Pracher
 Arthur Mentz

References

Bibliography 
 Martin Osterland. Gesellschaftsbilder in Filmen: Eine soziolog. Untersuchung d. filmangebots d. Jahre 1949–1964. Enke, 1970.

External links 
 

1952 films
1952 comedy films
German comedy films
West German films
1950s German-language films
Films directed by Paul Verhoeven (Germany)
German black-and-white films
Films shot in Berlin
1950s German films
Films shot at Göttingen Studios